Zirakabad (also Romanized as Zīrakābād) is a village in Shahrabad Rural District, Shahrabad District, Bardaskan County, Razavi Khorasan Province, Iran. At the 2006 census, its population was 1,026, in 281 families.

References 

Populated places in Bardaskan County